Barbora Bobuľová (born 29 April 1974) is an Italian actress. Since 1995, she has lived and worked mainly in Italy.

Life and work
Born in Martin, Bobuľová trained at the National Drama Academy in Bratislava before moving to Italy in 1995. She made her feature film debut in the Italian film The Prince von Homburg, that was selected to represent Italy at the 1997 Cannes Film Festival.

For her work in the 2005 film Cuore Sacro (Sacred Heart), she won Best Actress Awards at the David di Donatello awards, the Ciak d'oro awards and Audience Award for Best Actress at the Flaiano Film Festival in Pescara. In 2006 she received the Nastro Europeo at the Nastro d'Argento (Silver Ribbon) awards from the Italian National Syndicate of Film Journalists. 

Bobuľová's additional film credits include The Vanity Serum, Check and Mate, Mirka, Poor Liza, That's It and Green Ashes. American television audiences know Bobuľová from her starring role in the Hallmark Hall of Fame movie In Love and War, where she plays Eric Newby's girlfriend Wanda. Her additional TV credits include the Italian miniseries La Cittadella, La guerra è finita and Crociati. In 2008, Bobuľová co-starred with Shirley MacLaine in Coco Chanel. 

In addition to her native Slovak, Bobuľová is fluent in Czech, Italian, and English.

Personal Life 
Barbora had two daughters, Lea (in 2007) and Anita (in 2008) with her partner, assistant director Alessandro Casale.

Filmography

Films

Television

References

External links

1974 births
Living people
Slovak film actresses
David di Donatello winners
21st-century Slovak actresses
People from Martin, Slovakia
Slovak television actresses
Slovak expatriates in Italy
21st-century Italian actresses
Italian stage actresses
Italian film actresses
Italian television actresses